Tara Duncan (full name Tara'tylanhnem T'al Barmi Ab Santa Ab Maru T'al Duncan) is the heroine of the eponymous series of bestselling novels in French written by Sophie Audouin-Mamikonian.

Tara Duncan is a young girl who discovers she has strong, unlimited magical powers. She later learns that she is a “spellbinder” who was born on the planet Otherworld, where magic exists, and raised on Earth as an ordinary teenager by her maternal grandmother Isabella. Over time, Tara learns that she is the Imperial Spellbinder, who is considered to be the most powerful spellbinder of all time.

Otherworld contains a variety of beings, including evil wizards, giants, "vampyrs," dwarves, elves, merpeople, and two-headed administrators. Tara begins to learn that in addition to being the Imperial Spellbinder, she is the heiress and future Empress of the Omois Empire, the most powerful and largest monarchy of all the kingdoms, empires, and republics that belonged to her late father. 
Tara's companions in the series include her fellow Earthling Fabrice and the friends she makes on OtherWorld, including a half-elf called Robin M'angil, thief-in-training Caliban Dal Salan, the shapeshifting princess Gloria Daavil of Lancovit (nicknamed "Sparrow"), and a short-tempered but warmhearted female dwarf named Fafnir.

The series is written by Sophie Audouin-Mamikonian, who has so far written thirteen main Tara Duncan volumes in French. William Rodarmor has translated two of her books into English. The English translation by William Rodarmor of Volume 1, Tara Duncan and the Spellbinders, was published by Sky Pony Press in June 2012. Volume 2, Tara Duncan and the Forbidden Book, was published in January 2013.

A 2D-animated series that premiered in France in 2010 aired in the U.S. on the "Girls Rule" division of the video-on-demand service Kabillion. It was loosely based on the first book, and was cancelled after Episode 26 "The Naughty Little Vampire". Some of the fourteen books have also been translated into Japanese, Korean, Italian and Romanian. A new animated adaptation started airing in 2022. The new series is computer-animated and more faithful to the books.

Universe 

Otherworld, (or "" in the original French), is the planet on which the majority of Tara Duncan's adventures occur.

With a surface area of about one and a half times that of Earth's, OtherWorld has a rotation of 14 months around its sun. Days in OtherWorld last 26 hours, there are 10 days a week, and each year has 454 days. Two satellite moons, Madix and Tadix, orbit around OtherWorld and cause significant tides during equinoxes.

The magic that governs OtherWorld also equally influences the fauna, the flora, and the climate. Many different species live there, and because of this, the seasons are difficult to predict. During a "normal" year, there are seven seasons.

Many various peoples live on OtherWorld, with the principal peoples being humans, dwarves, giants, trolls, vampyrs, gnomes, goblins, elves, unicorns, chimeras, tatris, and dragons. They are all able to bond with a Familiar, a random animal, who becomes their soul companion for life. Once bonded, they feel the same things and die at the same time as each other.

The main countries in which the adventures of Tara Duncan take place are the Kingdom of Lancovit and the Empire of Omois, the birth countries of Tara's parents. Her late father was the future emperor of the latter.

List of Novels 
Tara Duncan and the Spellbinders
Tara Duncan and the Forbidden Book
The Cursed Scepter
The Renegade Dragon
The Forbidden Continent
In Magister’s Trap
The Phantom Invasion
The Evil Empress
Against the Black Queen
Dragons versus Demons
War of the Planets
The Final Battle
Tara and Cal
The OtherWorld Twins
 
The canceled 2010-2011 animated series is also known as Tara Duncan: The Evil Empress, even though its first and only season is loosely based on the original twenty-chapter novel.

Characters

Allies and Friends
Tara's gang is composed of Tara's two closest friends, Sparrow and Cal, who are referred to as "the Alpha Team" in the canceled show.

Tara'tylanhnem "Tara Duncan" T'al Barmi Ab Santa Ab Maru T'al Duncan is the main character of the series. She is a teenage girl with dark blue eyes and blond hair with a white lock, as she is a full member of the Imperial Family and the direct descendant/heir of High Wizard Demiderus T'al Barmi. She is tall and athletic. Her magical powers and abilities are immeasurably powerful because of being genetically tampered with by a renegade dragon. Tara is the Imperial Spellbinder, and she has to fight with a mysterious dark spellbinder while learning to be the Imperial Heiress and Crown Princess of Omois, as she is the heir and niece of Empress Lisbeth'tylahnem and the daughter of Emperor Danviou T'al Barmi Ab Santa Ab Maru, as well as Selena Duncan. However, Tara uses her magic to help people, by doing things that were called impossible before, such as curing vampyrs who drank human blood. Tara is brave, strong-willed and loyal, and would do anything for her friends. Her Familiar is a large white Pegasus named Galant.

Robin M'angil is the son of T'andilus M'angil, head of secret services of Lancovit, and Mevora, a human who is passionate about books and editor of numerous treatises. Being half elven is rare on Otherworld and Robin suffers because of the stigma of miscegenation and is rejected by other elves.

Caliban Dal Salan "Cal" is a Patented thief in training (a spy working for the government). Cheeky, daring, brave, and agile, he has a great sense of humor and sarcasm. He is small and thin, has black messy hair and grey eyes. He was in love with Eleanora, another licensed thief, who believed that Cal has killed her cousin and tried to get revenge. After she dies in volume 6, he becomes obsessed with avenging her at any cost. His Familiar is a red fox named Blondin. He becomes Tara's boyfriend in Book Eleven, and eventual boyfriend in the thirteenth book Tara and Cal and father to fraternal twins in the thirteenth and fourteen books; the later titled The Otherworld Twins and a second son named Daylon.

Princess Gloria Daavil "Sparrow" is the Princess of Lancovit, but she will never be queen, being only the niece of King Bear and Queen Titania. She is nicknamed "Sparrow" because she is shy, but becomes more confident over time. She can change from human to beast at will. She has long curly brown hair. Sensitive and reasonable, she is Tara's best friend and Fabrice's girlfriend. Her Familiar is a white panther named Sheeba. 

Fafnir is a red-haired dwarf from Hymlia, and a strong and ferocious warrior. Being the daughter of a chieftain, she is the equivalent of a princess among the dwarves. Like other dwarfs, she hates magic and tries to avoid it. She hates the fact that she has magic powers, something that makes her somewhat an outcast, and tries to get rid of them. She becomes Sylver's girlfriend in Volume 8. Her Familiar is Belzebuth, an almost immortal demon pink kitten encountered in Demon Limbo.

Fabrice is Tara's oldest friend from Earth, son of the Transfer Door's guardian. He has magical powers because her mother was exposed to the emanations of the Transfer Door during her pregnancy. However, his magic is extremely weaker than his friend's, and he's obsessed with the idea of gaining more power, sometimes by flirting with dark magic and forbidden spells. Described as handsome, he is tall, has blond hair and dark eyes. In love with Sparrow, his quest for more powers complicates their relationship. His Familiar was a blue mammoth named Barune.

Villains
Magister •	is the cruel and cunning master of all Bloodgraves. He is Tara's worst enemy and the one who kidnapped her mother Selena when Tara was two years old. Magister's goal is to free the demons, and he needs Tara's blood to do it. He wants to rule the world, but sometimes he shows positive feelings, such as his love for Selena. He always wears a mask that changes color according to his mood.
Selenba  is a terrible vampyr who drinks human blood. She is particularly cruel and violent with her victims. She is willing to do whatever Magister tells her to do. She has long white hair and red eyes, is thin and tall, and has pale skin. She used to be the fiancée of Safir Dragosh, who is still in love with her.
The Red Queen is a red female dragon, self-proclaimed the queen of the Forbidden Continent. Bigger than other dragons that Tara has met, she uses humans as her slaves and organizes fight between werewolves, dragons and humans.
The Black Queen is a black dragon female who is the titular character in the ninth novel Tara Duncan: Against the Black Queen.

Supporting Characters
Isabella Duncan is Tara's maternal grandmother and the woman who raised her for twelve years. She's ambitious, which sometimes makes her selfish and cruel. She is known as being a top-level spellbinder and is initially bad-tempered.
Selena Duncan is Tara's powerful and compassionate mother. She has been a prisoner of Magister for ten years but is found and set free by Tara in the first book. She has long curly brown hair and bright green eyes. 
Emperor Danviou T'al Barmi Ab Santa Ab Maru is Tara's father and was the Emperor of Omois before his death. He ran away from his role as the sovereign ruler of Omois and disappeared. He met Selena Duncan and they fell in love and married, having their daughter Tara. He was killed by Magister when Tara was only two, but appears to his preteen daughter as a ghost and later on in the series.
Tar and Mara are the long-lost younger fraternal twin brother and sister of Tara, and youngest children born to Selena and Emperor Danviou Barmi some time after Tara was just two years old. They were born shortly after Selena's kidnapping, and Magister raised them to believe that he was their father. 
Chemnashaovirodaintrachivu "Master Chem" is a blue and silver dragon who works in Lancovit and helps  Tara's gang. He often takes the form of an old wise man.
Empress Lisbeth'Tylanhem T'al Barmi Ab Santa Ab Maru is the Empress of Omois. She is Tara's paternal aunt and Danviou's older sister. Like Tara, she has enormously long blond hair with a white lock and dark blue eyes. Her beauty is legendary and devastating. Her near unlimited magical powers make a dangerous and respected ruler as well as a topmost and insanely powerful spellbinder of Omois.
Emperor Sandor T'al Barmi Ab March Ab Brevis is Lisbeth's half-brother and Emperor of Omois. He replaced his half brother Danviou when he died. He also has long blond hair, often tied in a low ponytail. He is a good warrior, leader of the Omois Army, and teaches his niece Tara how to fight hand-to-hand combat.
Sylver, debuting in Tara Duncan and the Phantom Invasion, is a handsome and mysterious boy with long blond hair and a scaly skin. Raised by the dwarfs, he's a fierce and formidable warrior. Kind, shy and a bit clumsy, he's willing to help Tara in her quest, at the risk of his life. When he's asleep, Sylver changes into a dangerous and strong creature who wants to kill and destroy everything. It ultimately is revealed that he is the son of Magister and a very powerful dragon called Ama, who was the daughter of the last Dragon King; making him a dragon/spellbinder hybrid.

Animated series

References

External links 

Author's US (English) Facebook page

Young adult novel series
Fantasy novel series
French children's novels
French fantasy novels